Visa requirements for Cameroonian citizens are administrative entry restrictions by the authorities of other states placed on citizens of Cameroon. As of 2 July 2019, Cameroonian citizens had visa-free or visa on arrival access to 46 countries and territories, ranking the Cameroonian passport 96th in terms of travel freedom (tied with passports from Burundi, Congo (Rep.) and Liberia) according to the Henley & Partners Passport Index.

Economic and Monetary Community of Central Africa
During the 12th Ordinary Session of CEMAC held in May 2015, the Heads of State decided to grant free movement of people within the region with immediate effect. So, Cameroonian citizens should be able to travel to Republic of Congo, Equatorial Guinea and Gabon without visas. However, this decision does not seem to have been implemented yet.

Visa requirements map

Visa requirements

Dependent, disputed, or restricted territories
Unrecognized or partially recognized countries

Dependent and autonomous territories

Non-visa restrictions

See also

Visa policy of Cameroon
Cameroonian passport

References and Notes
References

Notes

Cameroon
Foreign relations of Cameroon